Karina Myasnikova (born 2 September 1991 in Russia) is a Russian artistic gymnast.

Career 
Karina Myasnikova won a silver in senior team at the 2008 European Women's Artistic Gymnastics Championships.

References

Living people
1991 births
Russian female artistic gymnasts
Sportspeople from Moscow Oblast